Stu Allan (6 February 1962 – 22 September 2022) was a British dance music DJ and producer who worked for Piccadilly Radio and Key 103 in Manchester in the 1980s and 1990s. His hip hop, hardcore techno and house music mixes ranked him the world's No. 3 DJ by DJ Magazine in 1993 and his performances influenced significantly the music scene during this period. Allan continued to remain a major contributor within the UK hardcore scene..

Biography

Born and raised in Anglesey, Wales, he moved to Manchester in 1982 and took up DJing. Between 1984 and 1986, his mixes/remixes were featured on Piccadilly Radio, Manchester on various shows including those of Timmy Mallet, Chris Evans, and Tim Grundy.

In July 1986, he was given his own show on Piccadilly Radio. He was originally filling in for the regular DJ on a 6-week holiday, but the reaction was so great from listeners that he was signed on permanently. He began featuring hip-hop and house. "Love Can't Turn Around" by Farley Jackmaster Funk was the first record Allan played on the radio. This track got the attention of the people in charge of the station and Allan was asked to explain why he was playing this "music". He said he believed this was what listeners really wanted to hear (having seen clubbers going wild to tunes like "Jack Your Body", "Jack the Groove" and many other underground Chicago label tunes at his gigs), and convinced them that his choice of music was right when the station's ratings improved massively. During this period, Allan produced a soul show called "Souled Out" and a hip-hop show called "Bus 'Diss". He would also have a house hour which would feature the seamless mixing he is known for.

Allan was a big attraction at Bowlers in Trafford Park, Manchester. His choice of high energy old school music made him a favourite on the rave scene in the 1990s. Frequently misspelled as Stu Allen, even on promotional flyers. Allan was also a regular DJ on the Vibealite rave scene, performing at many of their events across the north of England.

He died on 22 September 2022, aged 60, after suffering a rare GIST.

Clock

Between 1993 and 1999, he was one half of the production team behind Eurodance act Clock. As well as having commercial success in the group, their songs were also released as hardcore remixes under the pseudonym Visa and were hits on the underground.

Radio

In 1999–2000, Kiss 100 approached him to mix and produce the now legendary "Kiss Mix" (Mon–Sat evenings) which became the most listened to shows at that time in London for 14 to 24-year-olds.

In 2005, he had a show named "Hardcore Nation" on Pure Dance. As of September 2012, Allan broadcast on Unity Radio 92.8FM in Manchester. He hosted "Oldskool Nation" on Sundays from 9pm to 11pm.

Since departing from Unity Radio, Allan broadcast with OSN Radio doing his show Old Skool Nation on Friday nights.

Compilation albums
Hardcore Nation (2005)
Hardcore Nation 2 (2005)
Hardcore Nation 3 (2006)
Hardcore Nation Classic (2007)
Hardcore Adrenaline (2007)
Hardcore Adrenaline 2 (2007)
Hardcore Adrenaline 3 (2007)
Hardcore Nation (2009)

References

External links
Brave Music Agency Bio
New Hardcore compilation CD Hardcore Adrenaline
 
 

1962 births
2022 deaths
English radio DJs
English DJs
English record producers
Musicians from Manchester
People from Anglesey
Deaths from stomach cancer
Electronic dance music DJs